Hynobius yangi, the Kori salamander, is a species of salamander endemic to southeastern South Korea. It is a lentic-breeding species similar to the Korean salamander (H. leechi) but is distinguished by factors including tail shape and dorsal coloration. The species is known from the vicinity of the type locality in Gijang County in northeastern Busan and from the nearby Ulju County in western Ulsan.

Etymology
The Kori salamander takes its common name from its type locality, Kori in Jangan-eup, Gijang County, in rural northern Busan. Its scientific name honours Suh-Yung Yang, a Korean herpetologist.

Description
Hynobius yangi males measure  (n=18 individuals) and females  in snout–vent length (n=3). Tail length is about 70–90% of snout–vent length. Males have relatively longer and higher tails than females. Dorsum is olive without dark speckles, or in some individuals, dark brownish dotted very finely with yellow speckles. The underside is lighter.

Breeding occurs from late February to late March. Egg sacs are coil-shaped.

Habitat and conservation
Hynobius yangi inhabits hilly forest areas. Breeding takes place in still water in ditches. Egg sacs are attached to water plants or fallen branches.

IUCN has assessed Hynobius yangi as "Endangered" because of its small distribution area and continuing habitat loss.

See also
List of amphibians of Korea
Korean crevice salamander

References

yangi
Amphibians described in 2003
Amphibians of Korea
Endemic fauna of South Korea
Busan